Mike Hinge (born Michael Barry Hinge, Auckland, August 9, 1931 – Philadelphia, August 2003) was an illustrator and graphic designer.

His work included portraits with a pop art influence for the cover of Time magazine: Japanese Emperor Hirohito in October, 1971 and Richard Nixon, as the Watergate crisis deepened, in November 1973. The artwork for both covers are now held by the Smithsonian.

References
 

1931 births
2003 deaths
American illustrators
People from Auckland
New Zealand emigrants to the United States